Association Pilotes Volontaires (French: 'Volunteer Pilots Association') is a charitable NGO based in France which flies Search and rescue missions looking for refugees in danger on the Mediterranean Sea with their two reconnaissance aircraft. It was founded by José Benavente and Benoît Micolon in January 2018. Their initial aircraft, a Dyn'Aéro MCR4S, was called Colibri, and flew its first mission in May 2018. 

Association Pilotes Volontaires typically operates by contacting the MRCC in Rome, rather than NGO rescue vessels directly.

As of June 2019, they had logged 52 missions, sighting 54 boats and by their estimates saving more than 4,300 people. At that date, the Association numbered 14 volunteer staff including eight pilots.

In December 2020, Association Pilotes Volontaires began operation of a second Dyn'Aéro MCR4S reconnaissance aircraft, named Colibri 2; both aircraft were still operational in December 2021.

References

External links
 pilotes-volontaires.org Association Pilotes Volontaires website

Sea rescue organizations
European migrant crisis
Immigrant rights activism
Humanitarian aid organizations in Europe
Refugee aid organizations in Europe